The Bennetts 2007 British Superbike Championship season started on 7 April and ended on 14 October.

Calendar

Entry List

Final championship standings (top 10)

Superbike cup final standings (top 10)

Final Constructors Standings

References

External links
 BSB Website

British
British Superbike Championship
Superbike